Joan Mary Waller Greenwood (4 March 1921 – 28 February 1987) was an English actress. Her husky voice, coupled with her slow, precise elocution, was her trademark. She played Sibella in the 1949 film Kind Hearts and Coronets, and also appeared in The Man in the White Suit (1951), Young Wives' Tale (1951), The Importance of Being Earnest (1952), Stage Struck (1958), Tom Jones (1963) and Little Dorrit (1987).

Greenwood worked mainly on the stage, where she had a long career, appearing with Donald Wolfit's theatre company in the years following World War II. Later, after the war, her appearances in Ealing comedies are among her memorable screen appearances: Whisky Galore!; as the seductive Sibella in the black comedy Kind Hearts and Coronets (1949); and in The Man in the White Suit (1951). She opened The Grass Is Greener in the West End in 1952 and played Gwendolen in a film version of The Importance of Being Earnest released in the same year.

She had leading roles in Stage Struck (1958) and then in Mysterious Island, an adaptation of a Jules Verne novel; and was nominated for the Golden Globe for Best Supporting Actress for Tom Jones (1963).

In 1960, Greenwood appeared as the title character in a production of Hedda Gabler at the Oxford Playhouse. Starring opposite her as Judge Brack was the actor André Morell. They fell in love and flew in secret to Jamaica, where they were married, remaining together until his death in 1978.

Early life and education
Greenwood was born in 1921 in Chelsea, London. Her parents were Ida (née Waller) and Sydney Earnshaw Greenwood (1887–1949), a portrait artist. She went to school at St Catherine's School, Bramley, leaving when fifteen. She originally wanted to be a ballet dancer but then decided to act and studied at the Royal Academy of Dramatic Art.

Career 
Greenwood worked for two years in repertory. Her fluency in French saw her cast in London in a production of The Imaginary Invalid when she was 18. Greenwood appeared in Little Ladyship (1939) on TV and in the short John Smith Wakes Up (1941). Her first feature was My Wife's Family (1941) followed by He Found a Star (1941).

She joined the Oxford Playhouse Repertory Company, and while there played leading- parts in a number of well known plays, such as School for Scandal, Caesar and Cleopatra, Hamlet and A Doll's House. She went back to the London stage and appeared in productions of Little Ladyship, Peter Pan, Heartbreak House, and The Women. While appearing in the latter she was seen by Leslie Howard who cast her in a notable role in The Gentle Sex (1943), which was a hit.

Greenwood had a support part in Frenzy (1945) and They Knew Mr. Knight (1946).

She appeared in the role of Wendy in Peter Pan and as Elie Dunn in Heartbreak House, She played Ophelia in Hamlet with the Donald Wolfit company, Nora in Doll House, Celia in Volpone and Sabina in The Young Wives' Tale.

Rank Organisation
Sydney Box offered her a seven year contract with the Rank Organisation, starting with the female lead in A Girl in a Million (1946). Box was so taken with her performance he changed the title to refer to her.

She had a good role in The Man Within (1947), billed after Michael Redgrave and Jean Kent, then co starred alongside John Mills in The October Man (1947) and Margaret Lockwood in The White Unicorn (1947).

Stardom
Greenwood was cast in the lead role of Saraband for Dead Lovers (1948), as Sophia Dorothea of Celle, alongside Stewart Granger. It was an expensive box-office failure.  She did The Importance of Being Earnest (1949) for TV; then played Lady Caroline Lamb in The Bad Lord Byron (1949), a notorious flop.

More successful was Whisky Galore! (1949), which kicked off the Ealing comedy cycle. It was directed by Alexander Mackendrick and Greenwood was top billed along with Basil Radford. She did another for Ealing, Kind Hearts and Coronets (1949), with Alec Guinness directed by Robert Hamer. Both films became regarded as comedy classics.

Greenwood was Richard Todd's leading lady in Flesh and Blood (1951), at British Lion. She went to France to co-star with Bourvil in Mr. Peek-a-Boo (1951). She did another for Ealing, Mackendrick and Guinness, The Man in the White Suit (1951), then Young Wives' Tale (1951) and did The Importance of Being Earnest (1952) again, this time as a feature film. She appeared on TV shows like BBC Sunday-Night Theatre.

Greenwood returned to France to appear in Lovers, Happy Lovers! (1954) with Gérard Philipe. She did The King and Mrs. Candle (1954) for American TV and made a third film with Guinness and a second with Hamer, Father Brown (1954). She did A Dolls House in Copenhagen then was in The Confidential Clerk by T.S. Eliot which had a short run on Broadway in 1954. 

In Hollywood she was the female lead in Moonfleet (1955) at MGM, replacing original choice Merle Oberon.

Later career
In 1956, Greenwood starred in The Grass is Greener on the West End. In the late 1950s, she worked increasingly on TV in versions of Man and Superman, Ann Veronica, Hedda Gabbler and The Grass is Greener. She had a support role in Stage Struck (1958), Mysterious Island (1961) and the female lead in The Amorous Mr. Prawn (1962). She married Andre Morell in 1960.

Greenwood had a flashy support role in Tom Jones (1963), and The Moon-Spinners (1964). She appeared as Olga, alongside Spike Milligan in Frank Dunlop's production of the play Oblomov, based on the novel by Russian writer Ivan Goncharov. The play opened at London's Lyric Theatre on 6 October 1964. Greenwood was described as "a model of generosity and tolerance...the only person in the cast who could not be 'corpsed' by Milligan; although he tried very hard. She looked beautiful, and played the part of Oblomov's unfortunate lady with total integrity. 'She never left the script', says Milligan with a guilty smile of something between irritation and admiration. 'I just couldn't make her crack up. All the rest of us did. She never lost her dignity for a moment.'"

She was in the play Those That Play the Clowns (1966) which had a short run on Broadway. Greenwood dubbed the voice of The Black Queen in Barbarella (1968) when the voice of actress Anita Pallenberg was judged unsuitable for the role. She was in The Great Inimitable Mr. Dickens (1970) and Girl Stroke Boy (1971).

Later roles included The Uncanny (1977), The Water Babies (1978), The Hound of the Baskervilles (1978), Bognor (1981), Triangle (1982), and Ellis Island (1985). 

She took over from Dame Celia Johnson on stage in The Understanding (1982) after Johnson's death.

She played Lady Carlton, a quirky romance novelist and the landlady to the main characters, in the British sitcom Girls on Top (1985–86). She was in Miss Marple: At Bertram's Hotel (1987). Her last film was Little Dorrit (1988), released posthumously. Her last TV series was Melba (1988).

She appeared on stage in a sketch with Robert Morley two weeks before her death.

Personal life and death
Greenwood married André Morell in 1960. Their son, Jason Morell, is an actor, writer and film/theatre director. In 1987, nine years after her husband's death, Greenwood died from acute bronchitis and asthma at her home in London, less than a week before her 66th birthday.

Partial filmography

My Wife's Family (1941) - Irma Bagshott
He Found a Star (1941) - Babe Cavour
The Gentle Sex (1943) - Betty Miller
Latin Quarter (1945) - Christine Minetti
They Knew Mr. Knight (1946) - Ruth Blake
A Girl in a Million (1946) - Gay Sultzman
The Man Within (1947) - Elizabeth
The October Man (1947) - Jenny Carden
The White Unicorn (1947) - Lottie Smith
Saraband for Dead Lovers (1948) - Sophie Dorothea
The Bad Lord Byron (1949) - Lady Caroline Lamb
Whisky Galore! (1949) - Peggy Macroon
Kind Hearts and Coronets (1949) - Sibella
Flesh & Blood (1951) - Wilhelmina Cameron
Le Passe-muraille (English: Mr Peek-a-boo) (1951) - Susan
The Man in the White Suit (1951) - Daphne Birnley
Young Wives' Tale (1951) - Sabina Pennant
The Importance of Being Earnest (1952) - Gwendolen Fairfax
Monsieur Ripois (1954) - Norah
Father Brown (1954) - Lady Warren
Moonfleet (1955) - Lady Ashwood
Stage Struck (1958) - Rita Vernon
Mysterious Island (1961) - Lady Mary Fairchild
The Amorous Prawn (1962) - Lady Dodo Fitzadam
Tom Jones (1963) - Lady Bellaston
The Moon-Spinners (1964) - Aunt Frances Ferris
Barbarella (1968) - The Great Tyrant (voice, uncredited)
Girl Stroke Boy (1971) - Lettice Mason
The Uncanny (1977) - Miss Malkin (segment "London 1912")
The Water Babies (1978, animated film) - Lady Harriet
The Hound of the Baskervilles (1978) - Beryl Stapleton
The Flame Is Love (1979, TV Movie) - Duchess of Grantham
Ellis Island (1984) - Madame Levitska At Bertram's Hotel (1987, TV Movie) - Selina HazyLittle Dorrit'' (1987) - Mrs. Clennam

References

External links
 
 
 
 
 
 Photographs of Joan Greenwood
 Screen Legends Joan Greenwood

1921 births
1987 deaths
Alumni of RADA
English film actresses
English stage actresses
English television actresses
People from Chelsea, London
Actresses from London
20th-century English actresses
British comedy actresses